Sky islands are isolated mountains surrounded by radically different lowland environments. The term originally referred to those found on the Mexican Plateau, and has extended to similarly isolated high-elevation forests. The isolation has significant implications for these natural habitats. Endemism, altitudinal migration, and relict populations are some of the natural phenomena to be found on sky islands.

The complex dynamics of species richness on sky islands draws attention from the discipline of biogeography, and likewise the biodiversity is of concern to conservation biology. One of the key elements of a sky island is separation by physical distance from the other mountain ranges, resulting in a habitat island, such as a forest surrounded by desert.

Some sky islands serve as refugia for boreal species stranded by warming climates since the last glacial period. In other cases, localized populations of plants and animals tend towards speciation, similar to oceanic islands such as the Galápagos Islands of Ecuador.

Etymology
Herpetologist Edward H. Taylor presented the concept of "Islands" on the Mexican Plateau in 1940 at the 8th American Scientific Congress in Washington, D. C. His abstract on the topic was published in 1942.

The sky island concept was later applied in 1943 when Natt N. Dodge, in an article in Arizona Highways magazine, referred to the Chiricahua Mountains in southeastern Arizona as a "mountain island in a desert sea".

In about the same era, the term was used to refer to high alpine, unglaciated, ancient topographic landform surfaces on the crest of the Sierra Nevada, California. 

The term was popularized by nature writer Weldon Heald, a resident of southeastern Arizona. His book mentions the concept of biome, but prefers the terminology of life zones, and makes reference to the work of Clinton Hart Merriam. The book also describes the wildlife and living conditions of the Chiricahuas.

Around the same time, the idea of mountains as islands of habitat took hold with scientists and has been used by such popular writers as David Quammen and John McPhee. This concept falls within the study of island biogeography. It is not limited to mountains in southwestern North America but can be applied to mountains, highlands, and massifs around the world.

Characteristics

The Madrean sky islands are probably the most studied sky islands in the world. Found in the U.S. states of New Mexico and Arizona and the Mexican states of Chihuahua and Sonora, these numerous mountains form links in a chain connecting the northern end of the Sierra Madre Occidental and the southern Colorado Plateau. Sky islands of the central and northern mountains in the United States are often called island ranges, especially by populations within view of such islands of mountains surrounded by plains such as those found within the Wichita Mountains of southwestern Oklahoma.

Some more northerly examples are the Crazy Mountains, Castle Mountains, Bears Paw Mountains, Highwood Mountains, and Little Rocky Mountains, all in the US state of Montana. Each of these ranges is forested and has tundra and snowpack above treeline, but is not connected to any other range by forested ridges; the ranges are completely surrounded by treeless prairie and/or semi-arid scrubland below. Other well-known sky islands of North America are the Great Basin montane forests, such as the White Mountains in California, and the Spring Mountains near Las Vegas, Nevada. One of the unique aspects of the sky islands of the U.S.-Mexico border region is the mix of floristic affinities, that is, the trees and plants of higher elevations are more characteristic of northern latitudes, while the flora of the lower elevations has ties to the desert and the mountains further south. Some unique plants and animals are found in these sky islands, such as the mountain yucca, Mount Graham red squirrel, Huachuca springsnail, and Jemez Mountains salamander.

Some montane species apparently evolved within their current range, adapting to their local environment, such as the Mount Lyell shrew. However, it has also been noted that some isolated mountain ecosystems have a tendency to lose species over time, perhaps because small, insularized populations are vulnerable to the forces of extinction, and the isolation of the habitat reduces the possibility of colonization by new species. Furthermore, some species, such as the grizzly bear, require a range of habitats. These bears historically made use of the forests and meadows found in the Madrean sky islands, as well as lower-elevation habitats such as riparian zones. (Grizzlies were extirpated from the region in the 20th century.) Seasonal movements between highland and lowland habitats can be a kind of migration, such as that undertaken by the mountain quail of the Great Basin mountains. These birds live in high elevations when free of snow, and instead of migrating south for the winter, they migrate down.

Confusing the matter somewhat is the potential for an archipelago of sky islands or even the valleys between them to act not only as a barrier to biological dispersal, but also as a path for migration. Examples of birds and mammals making use of the Madrean archipelago to extend their ranges northward are the elegant trogon and white-nosed coati.

List by terrestrial realms

Afrotropical realm

 Cal Madow
 Cameroonian Highlands forests
 Ethiopian Highlands
 Highlands of southern Africa
 Green Mountain of Ascension Island
 Guinea Highlands
Nimba Range
 Mount Cameroon and Bioko montane forests
 Mount Kilimanjaro
 Mount Gorongosa
 Rwenzori Mountains

Australasian realm
 Mount Wilhelm
 Mount Taranaki
 Waitakere Ranges

Indomalayan realm
 Mount Jerai
 Fansipan
 Jade Mountain
 Mount Kinabalu
 Nat Ma Taung
 Central Highlands (Vietnam)
 Titiwangsa Mountains
 Western Ghats

Nearctic realm
 Animas Mountains
 Black Range
 Capitan Mountains
 Chisos Mountains
 Colorado Plateau's San Francisco Peaks
 Chuska Mountains
 Great Basin montane forests
 Davis Mountains
 Guadalupe Mountains
 San Jacinto Mountains
 Madrean sky islands
 Manzano Mountains
 Mogollon Mountains
 Oscura Mountains
 Olympic Mountains
 Peloncillo Mountains 
 Quartz Mountains
 Sacramento Mountains
 San Augustin Mountains
 Sandia Mountains
 Spring Mountains
 Mount Taylor Volcano
 Wichita Mountains

Neotropical realm
 Baja California
 Sierra de la Laguna
 Sierra de Juarez
 Sierra San Pedro Mártir
 Cordillera of Central America
 Tepuis
 Serra do Mar
 Hispaniolan mountain ranges
Baoruco Mountain Range, Dominican Republic
Cordillera Central, Dominican Republic
Massif de la Hotte, Haiti
Chaîne de la Selle, Haiti
 Sierra de Tamaulipas
 Venezuelan Coastal Range

Palearctic realm
 Aïr Mountains
 Altai Mountains
 Baikal Mountains
 Caucasus
 Tibesti Mountains
 Tien Shan

See also
 Altitudinal zonation
 Life zone
 Holdridge life zones
 Inselberg or monadnock
 List of life zones by region
 Refugium (population biology)
 Table (landform)
 Tepui

References

External links 
 Sky Island Alliance homepage
 Sky Islands Traverse long-distance hiking route 
 Saguaro-Juniper Corp. webpage

Biogeography
Biodiversity
Endemism
Madrean Sky Islands mountain ranges
Montane ecology
Mountain ranges
Landforms